Kassem Hamzé (born 2 January 1950) is a Lebanese sprinter. He competed in the men's 400 metres at the 1972 Summer Olympics.

References

1950 births
Living people
Athletes (track and field) at the 1972 Summer Olympics
Lebanese male sprinters
Lebanese male middle-distance runners
Olympic athletes of Lebanon
Place of birth missing (living people)